Pete Wernick (born February 25, 1946), also known as "Dr. Banjo", is an American musician.

He is a five-string banjo player in the bluegrass music scene since the 1960s, founder of the Country Cooking and Hot Rize bands, Grammy nominee and educator, with several instruction books and videos on banjo and bluegrass, and a network of bluegrass jamming teachers called The Wernick Method. He served from 1986 to 2001 as the first president of the International Bluegrass Music Association. Wernick is also an outspoken atheist and humanist, and at one time led a secular humanist congregation in Boulder, Colorado.

Biography

Pete Wernick was born in New York City and began playing the banjo at the age of fourteen. He pursued studies at Columbia University, hosting New York City's only bluegrass radio program in the 1960s on WKCR-FM and earning a Ph.D. in sociology, thus the moniker "Dr. Banjo". In 1970 while working at Cornell University, he formed Country Cooking in Ithaca, New York together with Tony Trischka, Russ Barenberg, John Miller, and Nondi Leonard. They recorded four albums for Rounder Records, adding the talents of Kenny Kosek, Harry Gilmore (later known as Lou Martin), and Andy Statman, among others.

In 1976, Wernick and his wife Nondi Leonard (now known as Joan Wernick), settled in Niwot, Colorado and with Tim O'Brien began to develop "Niwot Music", consisting only of banjo, mandolin and bass. The music was showcased on his 1977 solo album "Dr. Banjo Steps Out". In January 1978, with O'Brien, Charles Sawtelle, and Mike Scap, he started the bluegrass band Hot Rize. Nick Forster replaced Scap in May, 1978, completing the band's classic lineup that recorded and performed nationally and internationally full-time for 12 years, through April, 1990. Hot Rize recorded many Wernick-penned originals, including the standard "Just Like You", and instrumentals "Gone Fishing" and "Powwow the Indian Boy". After disbanding as a full-time unit, the group continued with several performances a year until 1998, the year before Sawtelle's death. Currently leading the bluegrass/jazz combo Flexigrass, and a sometime member of the Colorado bluegrass band Long Road Home, he also performs with his wife Joan ("Dr. and Nurse Banjo") and with Hot Rize for limited tours and music festivals.

In 1986 the Board of the newly formed IBMA (International Bluegrass Music Association) elected Wernick its first president, a position he held until 2001.

Wernick was one of the members of the short-lived bluegrass supergroup Men with Banjos who Know How to Use Them, a group that included Steve Martin and Earl Scruggs among its other members.

In 2010, the Wernicks became the first Americans to tour in Russia as a bluegrass act, performing at the first annual Russian bluegrass festival in Vologda and Semenkovo, and in St. Petersburg. The duet has also performed in recent years in Ireland, England, Denmark, Israel, the Czech Republic, Germany, Switzerland, and Holland.

Wernick is a prominent teacher of bluegrass, having hosted over 200 music camps since 1980 and still conducting several each year. After starting as banjo camps, since 1999 the camps have focused mostly on bluegrass jamming for all bluegrass instruments. Wernick has produced 10 instructional videos for Homespun and his books "Bluegrass Banjo" and "Bluegrass Songbook" have together sold over a third of a million copies. He also co-authored in 1987 with Tony Trischka, the encyclopedic "Masters of the Five String Banjo". Since 1999 his website, DrBanjo.com has presented many instruction articles and an Ask Dr. Banjo section.

In 2010 Wernick created The Wernick Method, a national network of bluegrass teachers he certifies to teach bluegrass jamming. As of 2020, Wernick Method teachers have conducted 900 classes in 46 states and 11 countries, registering over 10,000 students.

Wernick is also a survivor of the United Airlines Flight 232 air disaster. He composed a song inspired by that incident, called "A Day In '89 (You Never Know)", however has not released a recording of it yet. He showed up for the blugrass festival Winterhawk just days after the crash, having to borrow musical instruments, as his had been destroyed in the crash.

References

External links
Official Website
Flexigrass

1946 births
American banjoists
Living people
Survivors of aviation accidents or incidents
Jewish American musicians
American atheists
American country banjoists
Hot Rize members
21st-century American Jews